Safy Nebbou (born 27 April 1968) is a French actor and director.

Life and career
Nebbou was born on 27 April 1968 in Bayonne, Pyrénées-Atlantiques, France to a German mother and an Algerian father. He is the brother of actor Mehdi Nebbou.

He started his career as a stage director at the Théâtre des Chimères in Bayonne, where Tsilla Chelton was one of his mentors, and worked as an actor. Subsequently, he directed short films, commercials for France Télécom, Orange and Renault, and feature films.

Filmography

References

External links

 

1958 births
Living people
20th-century French male actors
21st-century French male actors
French film directors
French male film actors
French male stage actors
French male screenwriters
French people of Algerian descent
French people of German descent
People from Bayonne